Events from the year 1916 in France.

Incumbents
President: Raymond Poincaré 
President of the Council of Ministers: Aristide Briand

Events
29 January – Paris is bombed by German zeppelins for the first time.
21 February – Battle of Verdun begins.
27 April – Battle of Hulluch in World War I, 47th Brigade, 16th Irish Division decimated in one of the most heavily concentrated gas attacks of the war.
16 May – Britain and France conclude the secret Sykes-Picot Agreement to divide Arab areas of the Ottoman Empire following the conclusion of World War I into French and British spheres of influence.
1 July – First day on the Somme.
14 July – Battle of Bazentin Ridge, start of the second phase of the Battle of the Somme.
15 September – Battle of Flers-Courcelette begins and lasts for a week, third and last large-scale offensive by the British Army during the Battle of the Somme.
25 September – Battle of Morval.
26 September – Battle of Thiepval Ridge begins, German fortress of Thiepval is captured by the British.
28 September – Battle of Thiepval Ridge ends successfully, with the capture of the Schwaben Redoubt.
13 November – Battle of the Ancre launches, the final act of the Battle of the Somme.
18 November – Battle of the Somme ends.
18 December – Battle of Verdun ends.

Sport

Births

January to June
11 January – Bernard Blier, actor (died 1989)
22 January – Henri Dutilleux, composer (died 2013)
14 February – Marcel Bigeard, military officer (died 2010)
16 February – Julien Darui, international soccer player (died 1987)
20 March – Pierre Messmer, Gaullist politician and Prime Minister (died 2007)
4 April – Robert Charpentier, cyclist and Olympic gold medallist (died 1966)
9 April – Léonie Duquet, nun (killed by a death squad in Argentina died 1977)
5 May – Andrée Clair, writer (died 1982)
6 May – Jacques-Laurent Bost, journalist (died 1990)
25 May – André Devigny, soldier and French Resistance member (died 1999)
30 May – Jacques Georges, soccer administrator (died 2004)
3 June – Denise Vernac, actress (died 1984)
10 June – André Mandouze, academic and journalist (died 2006)
16 June – Francis Cammaerts, Special Operations Executive (SOE) agent (died 2006)

July to December
22 July – Marcel Cerdan, boxer (died 1949)
24 August – Léo Ferré, poet, composer, singer and musician (died 1993)
17 September – Francis Lefebure, physician (died 1988)
21 September – Françoise Giroud, journalist, screenwriter, writer and politician (died 2003)
18 October – Jean-Yves Couliou, painter (died 1995)
19 October – Jean Dausset, immunologist, shared the Nobel Prize in Physiology or Medicine in 1980 (died 2009)
26 October – François Mitterrand, President of France from 1981 to 1995 (died 1996)
14 November – Roger Apéry, mathematician (died 1994)

Full date unknown
Lucienne Abraham, Trotskyist politician (died 1970)

Deaths
17 January – Marie Bracquemond, Impressionist painter (born 1840)
22 February – Émile Driant, nationalist writer, politician, and army officer (born 1855; killed in action)
4 March – Franz Marc, German painter and printmaker (born 1880)
21 March – Léon Labbé, surgeon and politician (born 1832)
12 May – Frank Cheadle, Australian rugby league footballer and World War I soldier (born 1885)
19 May – Georges Boillot, motor racing driver and World War I fighter pilot (born 1884)
25 May – Jane Dieulafoy, archaeologist and novelist (born 1851)
29 June – Georges Lacombe, sculptor and painter (born 1868)
6 July – Odilon Redon, painter and printmaker (born 1840)
8 July – Augustin Cochin, historian (born 1876)
28 August – Henri Harpignies, painter (born 1819)
26 September – Max Ritter von Mulzer, World War I German flying ace (born 1893)
13 December – Antonin Mercié, sculptor and painter (born 1845)
14 December – Frédéric Febvre, actor (born 1835)

See also
 List of French films of 1916

References

1910s in France